Reizei Tamechika (Japanese: 冷泉為恭) also known as Okada Tamechika (岡田為恭) (20 October 1823, Kyoto - 8 June 1864, Yamato, Nara Prefecture) was a Japanese artist from the later Edo Period who was instrumental in reviving the classical style known as Yamato-e.

Biography 
He was the third son of the painter, Kanō Eitai. He became dissatisfied with the prevailing Kanō school style and took up the older Yamato-e style instead, although not as taught by the Tosa school, but rather the Yamato-e of the Heian and Kamakura periods; spending many years collecting examples. He was especially interested in the Kamakura artist, Fujiwara no Nobuzane. and made numerous copies of his works.  

Under the name "Reizei" (冷泉) or "Fujiwara" (藤原) he produced numerous works on traditional themes, using ancient techniques. Later, he was adopted by the court nobleman, Okada Dewa no Kami, after which he signed his name as "Okada" or "Sugawara" (菅原). It is notable that he called himself Reizei without permission of the Reizei family.

His later works, such as the Fusuma-e (sliding door pictures) at the Daiju-ji temple in Okazaki, use classical themes but are presented with a more modern approach. He also portrayed the occasional Buddhist theme, due to his friendship with a priest named Gankai.     

He also became involved in politics, when his revival of Yamato-e got him involved with Sonnō jōi, the movement to restore the Emperor; via the artist Tanaka Totsugen. Tamechika supported the restoration, but his professional contacts with the Sakai clan, who were "Fudai daimyo" (vassals and retainers) of the Tokugawa Shogunate, created suspicion among some of the more radical samurai supporters of the Emperor. As a result, he was forced to hide in Wakayama Prefecture and adopt the priestly name "Shinrenbō Kōa". Nevertheless, he was discovered and murdered by hired assassins from the Choshu Clan.

References

Further reading 
 Suzuki, Toshihiko (Ed.): "Okada Tamechika", In: Nihon daihyakka zensho (Denshibukku-han), Shogakukan, 1996.
 Tazawa, Yutaka: "Okada Tamechika". In: Biographical Dictionary of Japanese Art. Kodansha International, 1981.

External links

 More works by Tamechika @ ArtNet
 Biography @ Jyuluck-do Corporation

1823 births
1864 deaths
Japanese painters
Edo-period works
Artists from Kyoto